The Forcall Formation is an Early Cretaceous (Aptian) geologic formation in Spain. Dinosaur remains are among the fossils that have been recovered from the formation, although none have yet been referred to a specific genus.

Correlation

See also 
 List of dinosaur-bearing rock formations
 List of stratigraphic units with indeterminate dinosaur fossils

References

Bibliography 
  

Geologic formations of Spain
Lower Cretaceous Series of Europe
Cretaceous Spain
Aptian Stage
Marl formations
Limestone formations
Deep marine deposits
Paleontology in Spain
Formations